Zoe McLellan (born November 6, 1974) is an American actress known for roles in JAG, Dirty Sexy Money, NCIS: New Orleans and Designated Survivor.

Early life and education
McLellan was born in La Jolla, California, and raised in Washington. In 1992, she was homecoming queen at South Kitsap High School in Port Orchard, Washington.

Career 
In 1995, she began her career on television, appearing over the next five years on episodes of Sliders, Diagnosis: Murder, and Star Trek: Voyager. In 2000, McLellan had her first major movie role, in the fantasy film Dungeons & Dragons.

In 2001, McLellan joined the cast of CBS procedural JAG, in a recurring role as Navy Petty Officer Jennifer Coates. For the final season of the show she was elevated to series regular. After the series ended, McLellan was cast as the wife of Peter Krause's character, in the ABC soapy comedy-drama series Dirty Sexy Money. The series was canceled after two seasons in 2009. McLellan later guest-starred on House and The Mentalist, and also had roles in Lifetime TV movies.

In 2014, she began playing the female leading role in the CBS procedural drama NCIS: New Orleans. In July 2016, it was reported that she would not return for season three.

In 2017, McLellan was cast in a series regular role in the second season of ABC's Designated Survivor as White House Counsel Kendra Daynes.

Filmography

References

External links
 
 

1974 births
Actresses from San Diego
American film actresses
American television actresses
Living people
20th-century American actresses
21st-century American actresses